Idaea moniliata, common name chequered wave, is a moth of the family Geometridae.

Description
The background color of the wings is whitish with light brown thin lines, a row of relatively large round white spots (hence the Latin name moniliata, meaning with collar or necklace) and tiny, dark dots on the edge. This univoltine species fly from late May to early August. The larva feeds on withered leaves of various low-growing herbaceous plants, especially Vetch (Vicia species), Hawkbit (Leontodon species) and Forget-me-not (Myosotis species).

Distribution and habitat
This species can be found in most of Europe and the Near East. It mainly lives on limestone background and dry meadows.

References
 Axel Hausmann: The Geometrid moths of Europe, 2. Sterrhinae. In A. Hausmann (Hrsg.): The Geometrid Moths of Europe 2. Apollo Books, Stenstrup 2004.

External links

Fauna europaea
Moths and Butterflies of Europe and North Africa
Lotmoths
Lepiforum.de

Sterrhini
Moths of Europe
Moths of Asia
Moths described in 1775
Taxa named by Michael Denis
Taxa named by Ignaz Schiffermüller